Yarem Qayah-e Vasat (also Romanized as Yārem Qayah-e Vasaţ; also known as Yārem Qayyah-e Vosţā, Yārem Qīyeh-ye Vosţá, Yarim Ghiyeh Vosta, Yārīm Qīyeh-ye Vasaţ, and Yārīm Qīyeh-ye Vosţá) is a village in Qaleh Darrehsi Rural District, in the Central District of Maku County, West Azerbaijan Province, Iran. At the 2006 census, its population was 100, in 20 families.

References 

Populated places in Maku County